In mathematics, especially representation theory and combinatorics, a Frobenius characteristic map is an isometric isomorphism between the ring of characters of symmetric groups and the ring of symmetric functions. It builds a bridge between representation theory of the symmetric groups and algebraic combinatorics. This map makes it possible to study representation problems with help of symmetric functions and vice versa. This map is named after German mathematician Ferdinand Georg Frobenius.

Definition

The ring of characters 

In particular  and therefore . The ring of characters is defined to be the direct sumwith the following multiplication to make  a graded commutative ring.

Frobenius characteristic map 

Remarks 
For example, given ,  is a conjugacy class. Note this always makes sense because  is a class function.

Finally,  is defined to be , where  is the cardinality of the conjugacy class . For example, when , . The second definition of can therefore be justified directly.

Properties

Inner product and isometry

Hall inner product 
The inner product on the ring of symmetric functions is the Hall inner product. It is required that  . To be precise, let  be a partition of integer, thenIn particular, with respect to this inner product,  form a orthogonal basis: , and the Schur polynomials  form a orthonormal basis: , where  is the Kronecker delta.

Inner product of characters 
Let , their inner product is defined to be

If , then

Frobenius characteristic map as an isometry 
One can prove that the Frobenius characteristic map is an isometry by explicit computation. To show this, it suffices to assume that :

Ring isomorphism 
The fact that this map is a ring homomorphism can be shown by Frobenius reciprocity.

In particular, if  is an irreducible representation, then  is a Schur polynomial of  variables. Therefore it is an isomorphism.

Example

Computing the Frobenius image 
Therefore:Since  is an irreducible representation (which can be shown by computing its characters), the computation above gives the Schur polynomial of three variables corresponding to the partition .

References 

Representation_theory
Combinatorics